The Municipality of Cirkulane a municipality in the Haloze area of Slovenia. The seat of the municipality is the settlement of Cirkulane. The municipality lies between the right bank of the Drava River and the border with Croatia. The area belongs to the traditional region of Styria. It is now included in the Drava Statistical Region.

Settlements
In addition to the municipal seat of Cirkulane, the municipality also includes the following settlements:

 Brezovec
 Dolane
 Gradišča
 Gruškovec
 Mali Okič
 Medribnik
 Meje
 Paradiž
 Pohorje
 Pristava
 Slatina
 Veliki Vrh

References

External links
 
 Municipality of Cirkulane on Geopedia
 Cirkulane municipal site

Cirkulane
2006 establishments in Slovenia